Wilhelm Werner Müller (1 June 1946 – 15 July 2019) was a German businessman and politician. He served as Federal Minister for Economic Affairs and Energy from 1998 to 2002. He then became CEO of RAG AG from 2003, of which Evonik was derived in 2007. His management of a reduction in Germany's dependence on coal in a socially responsible way won him the Manager of the Year award in Germany in 2008. He was chairman of the supervisory board of Deutsche Bahn.

Career 
He studied in Mannheim, both national economy and piano at the Musikhochschule Mannheim. He later studied philosophy and linguistics in Duisburg and Bremen.

Müller worked from 1973 for RWE. In 1979, he moved to VEBA, which became part of E.ON in 2002.

As a politician, Müller, who belonged to no party, served as Federal Minister for Economic Affairs and Energy from 1998 to 2002, when Gerhard Schröder (SPD) was Chancellor. After the 1998 German federal election, Schröder made him minister, after the designated candidate, Jost Stollmann had turned down the position because the responsibilities of the ministry were being reduced. When Oskar Lafontaine resigned in 1999, Müller was also temporarily appointed as the Minister of Finance. Müller worked towards a first nuclear power phase-out (Ausstieg aus der Atomenergie) in Germany, in negotiations with the industries.

Müller was CEO of the RAG AG, the former Ruhrkohle AG, from 2003. In 2007, the company became Evonik, now with a focus on chemistry, energy and real estate. According to former employer Evonik and German President Horst Köhler, Müller managed a reduction in Germany's dependence on coal (Ausstieg aus der Kohleenergie) as an energy source, trying to mitigate the issues caused by this fuel, namely damage to the environment and the large subsidies needed in mining, in a socially responsible way. That year, he moved from CEO of Evonik to chairman of its supervisory board. Müller held the same position for Deutsche Bahn from 2005 to 2010.

Müller was a member of the supervisory board of Borussia Dortmund. He was instrumental in the successful application of the Ruhr as European Capital of Culture in 2010, uniting the region.

Müller was married; he and his wife Marion had two children. In April 2018, he received the Order of Merit of North Rhine-Westphalia for his life's achievements (für sein Lebenswerk) in the presence of Gerhard Schröder. He resigned from all offices in May 2018, due to his cancer illness. He died in Essen on 15 July 2019.

Legacy 
In his laudatio for Müller in 2009, awarding the Great Cross of the Order of Merit of the Federal Republic of Germany, President Horst Köhler focused on Müller's ability to speak the language of both politics and economy, and enable dialogue between them. In the matter of nuclear power phase-out, he managed to represent the voters' wishes even though they were not his own view, and he always held constructive discussions with people representing different positions and interests. Köhler mentioned Müller's competence, calm manner, equanimity and dependability. In turning away from coal mining, he created a model of a socially responsible structural transition, with patience and tenacity.

After his death, Schröder acknowledged Müller as a great economic leader who knew the rules of the game of both business and politics, which enabled him to turn opponents to partners. Jean-Claude Juncker, President of the European Commission, noted Müller's enormous expertise, dry humour and calm manner, achieving invaluable benefits for the German miners. Armin Laschet (CDU, Minister-president of North Rhine-Westphalia, called him a visionary, and the founding of the RAG-Stiftung "a genuine work of the century" (ein echtes Jahrhundertwerk).

Awards 

 2008:  in Germany, by Manager Magazin
 2010: Great Cross of the Order of Merit of the Federal Republic of Germany
 2013:  as CEO of RAG-Stiftung
 2015: Honorary doctorate of the University Duisburg-Essen
 2018: Order of Merit of North Rhine-Westphalia

References

External links 

1946 births
2019 deaths
Commanders Crosses of the Order of Merit of the Federal Republic of Germany
Economy ministers of Germany
Federal government ministers of Germany
20th-century German politicians
21st-century German politicians
Politicians from Essen